Večernja škola (English: Evening school) is a Croatian comedy show hosted by Željko Pervan that originally aired on OTV between 1995 and 1998. After achieving considerable popularity in the region, its subsequent seasons were aired on Nova TV and HRT.

It is largely improvisational and spontaneous, featuring Pervan as a teacher to a group of students, debating various political and societal problems in a satirical way.

The original 1995 cast consisted of Željko Pervan, Zlatan Zuhrić, Mladen Horvat, Đuro Utješanović and Ahmed El Rahim.

References

1995 Croatian television series debuts
Croatian comedy television series
2000s Croatian television series
1990s Croatian television series